A number of ships have carried the name Japara:

, a 1,198-ton merchant vessel, operated by Koninklijke Paketvaart-Maatschappij.
, a 3,323-ton merchant vessel, operated by Koninklijke Paketvaart-Maatschappij, sought refuge in Australia after fall of Java operating in Australia—New Guinea waters under charter to United States Army in the Southwest Pacific Area (SWPA), local fleet identification number X-18, 26 March 1942 to 8 May 1945.
, a  motor ship built 1938 for Rotterdamsche Lloyd serving through various charter agreements from 13 December 1941 to 1946 as a transport for United States Army on oceanic routes with activity in SWPA on occasion.

Citations

References

Ship names